Patrice Marquet (born 23 October 1966) is a French former professional footballer who played as a midfielder.

References

1966 births
Living people
Association football midfielders
French footballers
Paris Saint-Germain F.C. players
SC Bastia players
SC Toulon players
FC Girondins de Bordeaux players
RC Lens players
Le Havre AC players
AS Cannes players
FC Gueugnon players
Ligue 1 players
Ligue 2 players